The Emergency Preparedness Operational Command Unit (CO3) is a branch of the Central Operations directorate within London's Metropolitan Police Service. The unit's role is to ensure that the communities and the police of London are prepared and ready to deal with major terrorist attacks. This includes the forming of contingency plans, and organising training events for the Metropolitan Police to test their CBRN response. The unit was formed in 2004, under the Civil Contingencies Act 2004, which puts a responsibility on the Chief Officers of the MPS to ensure that the police are prepared.

Role 

The three main areas of focus for the unit, are planning emergency procedures such as evacuations, identifying and recognising vulnerable premises and educating against threats. The unit was involved in planning anti-terror operations for the 2012 Olympics and Paralympics, in conjunction with other units. In the event of a major terror attack, the unit would be responsible for an identification call centre for victims' families.

The objectives of the unit mostly involve contingency planning, exercising major incident procedures, organising body recovery in the event of an attack, advising senior staff and officers in charge of major incidents, liaison with other organisations such as the Ambulance Service and Fire Service. The unit is also heavily involved in staging mock attacks on premises and companies to test preparedness and evacuation times.

See also
Emergency management
London Fire and Emergency Planning Authority
Civil Contingencies Secretariat

References

External links
Emergency Preparedness Operational Command Unit official website

Metropolitan Police units